Alejandra Pía Pérez Espina (born 25 February 1977) is a Chilean political activist and current member of the Chilean Constitutional Convention.

She is a breast cancer patient since 2016. She became known during the Social Outbrust (2019–20) for going out to demonstrate with her naked torso revealing her double mastectomy. According her, one of his main goals in the Convention are related with health rights, education and pensions.

References

External links
 BCN Profile

Living people
1978 births
Chilean activists
21st-century Chilean politicians
Members of the List of the People
Members of the Chilean Constitutional Convention